Karla Goltman (born 9 January 1967) is an Argentine diver. She competed in the women's 3 metre springboard event at the 1992 Summer Olympics.

References

External links
 

1967 births
Living people
Argentine female divers
Olympic divers of Argentina
Divers at the 1992 Summer Olympics
Place of birth missing (living people)
20th-century Argentine women